Bierk is a surname. Notable people with the surname include:

David Bierk (1944–2002), American-born Canadian painter
Sebastian Bach (born Sebastian Philip Bierk in 1968), Canadian singer-songwriter
Zac Bierk (born 1976), Canadian ice hockey player

See also
Birk (name)